Justin Healy Shafer (born September 18, 1992) is an American professional baseball pitcher who is a free agent. He has played in Major League Baseball (MLB) for the Toronto Blue Jays and Miami Marlins.

High school and college
Shafer graduated from Lake Wales High School in his home town of Lake Wales, Florida. Undrafted out of high school, he then attended the University of Florida, where he was both a pitcher and a position player. In his freshman season, Shafer recorded a .284 batting average and 27 runs batted in (RBI), and a 4.50 earned run average (ERA) in six relief pitching appearances. As a sophomore, Shafer hit .300 with five home runs and 25 RBI, and posted a 1–1 win–loss record, 5.20 ERA, and 26 strikeouts in 27 innings. In his final season with the Gators, he hit .211 with one home run and 10 RBI, and went 1–0 on the mound with a 4.17 ERA and 27 strikeouts in 36 innings.

In 2012 and 2013, he played collegiate summer baseball in the Cape Cod Baseball League for the Yarmouth-Dennis Red Sox.

Professional career

Toronto Blue Jays
Shafer was selected in the eighth round of the 2014 Major League Baseball draft by the Toronto Blue Jays. He was assigned to the Short Season-A Vancouver Canadians for the remainder of the 2014 season, and went 1–3 with a 5.16 ERA and 23 strikeouts in 22 innings pitched. Shafer was assigned to the Class-A Lansing Lugnuts to begin 2015, and was later promoted to the Advanced-A Dunedin Blue Jays. Operating as a swingman, Shafer posted an 8–9 record, 4.15 ERA, and 53 strikeouts in 95 innings. During the offseason, Shafer pitched for the Salt River Rafters of the Arizona Fall League (AFL). He spent the entire 2016 season with Dunedin, going 4–6 with a 5.23 ERA and 62 strikeouts in a career-high 115 innings. Shafer returned to the AFL in the offseason, appearing in seven games for the Mesa Solar Sox.

Shafer was converted to a full-time reliever to begin the 2017 campaign. After five scoreless appearances with Dunedin, he was promoted to the Double-A New Hampshire Fisher Cats. Shafer spent the majority of the year with New Hampshire, and earned a late-season promotion to the Triple-A Buffalo Bisons. In total, Shafer made 44 relief appearances in 2017 and went 5–2 with a 2.90 ERA and 65 strikeouts in 71 innings. On January 24, 2018, the Blue Jays invited Shafer to spring training. He split his time in 2018 between New Hampshire and Buffalo. 

On August 19, 2018, Shafer was called up by the Blue Jays and made his debut the same day in relief against the New York Yankees, throwing a scoreless inning with a strikeout. He was outrighted off the roster on November 2, 2018 and assigned to Triple-A Buffalo to start the 2019 season. Shafer had his contract selected on May 28, 2019. He was optioned back to Buffalo on June 3. He ended the season with a record of 2-1 in 34 games. He struck out 39 in  innings but also walked 25 batters. Shafer was designated for assignment on November 20, 2019.

Cincinnati Reds
On November 25, 2019, Shafer was traded to the Cincinnati Reds in exchange for cash considerations. On July 24, 2020, Shafer was designated for assignment by the Reds organization.

Miami Marlins
On July 27, 2020, Shafer was claimed off waivers by the Miami Marlins. On September 9, 2020, Shafer was designated for assignment and released the same day by the Marlins. Shafer allowed no runs with 2 strikeouts in 1.0 inning pitched for the Marlins in 2020.

Kansas City Monarchs
On March 8, 2021, Shafer signed with the Kansas City Monarchs of the American Association of Professional Baseball. In 5 games for the Monarchs, Shafer recorded a 2-1 record and 5.59 ERA with 26 strikeouts in 19.1 innings pitched.

On June 18, 2021, Shafer’s contract was purchased by the Chicago Cubs organization. However, Shafer did not play in a game for the Cubs organization and returned to the Monarchs on July 2.

After the 2021 season Shafer would become a free agent.

References

External links

1992 births
American expatriate baseball players in Canada
Baseball players from Florida
Buffalo Bisons (minor league) players
Dunedin Blue Jays players
Florida Gators baseball players
Lansing Lugnuts players
Living people
Major League Baseball pitchers
Mesa Solar Sox players
Miami Marlins players
New Hampshire Fisher Cats players
People from Lake Wales, Florida
Salt River Rafters players
Toronto Blue Jays players
Vancouver Canadians players
Yarmouth–Dennis Red Sox players